Faleh al-Ziyadi is an Iraqi politician who has been the Governor of Muthanna since 2015.

References

Governors of Muthanna Governorate
Iraqi politicians
People from Muthanna Governorate
Iraqi Muslims
Living people
Year of birth missing (living people)